Allen David Broussard Catfish Creek Preserve is a Florida State Park, located about ten miles east of Dundee, off US 27. This region is part of the Atlantic coastal plain.

Wildlife
This state park is home to cougars, wood storks, foxes, deer, Florida scrub jays, salamanders, bald eagles, gopher tortoises, bobcats, coyotes, Florida scrub lizards, coral snakes and American alligators

Access
There is no entrance charge. Florida state parks are open between 8 a.m. and sundown every day of the year (including holidays).

Gallery

References and external links
Allen David Broussard Catfish Creek Preserve State Park at Florida State Parks

State parks of Florida
Parks in Polk County, Florida